A New World: A Life of Thomas Paine is a 2009 biographical play by the English playwright Trevor Griffiths on the life of Thomas Paine. Other characters in it include Benjamin Franklin (who appears both as the historical figure and as a narrator), George Washington, Edmund Burke, John Adams and Georges Danton. Its first half tells of Paine's involvement in the American Revolution and its second half of his involvement in the French Revolution, ending with his funeral.

The play began life as a two-part screenplay for Richard Attenborough ; though never filmed, it was published in 2005 as 'These Are The Times': A life of Thomas Paine'. It was later adapted for the stage and premiered in the latter format on 29 August 2009 at Shakespeare's Globe. It ran there until 9 October 2009, directed by Dominic Dromgoole and starring John Light in the title role. It continues a run of new plays at the Globe on the broad theme of revolution, following Eric Schlosser's We The People and Jack Shepherd's Holding Fire! in 2007, and Glyn Maxwell's Liberty in 2008.

See also
 List of plays and musicals about the American Revolution

References

 

2009 plays
English plays
Biographical plays about writers
Fiction set in the 18th century
Plays set in the United States
Plays set in France
Plays about war
French Revolution in fiction
Plays about the American Revolution
Plays based on real people
Cultural depictions of Thomas Paine
Cultural depictions of Georges Danton
Cultural depictions of Benjamin Franklin
Cultural depictions of George Washington
Cultural depictions of John Adams